Chiang Khwan is a district (amphoe) of Roi Et province, Thailand.

Geography
Neighboring districts are (from the north clockwise): Pho Chai, Selaphum, Thawat Buri, Mueang Roi Et, and Changhan of Roi Et Province, and Rong Kham of Kalasin province.

History
The minor district (king amphoe) was created on 30 April 1994, when six tambons were split off from Thawat Buri district.

The Thai government on 15 May 2007 upgraded all 81 minor districts to full districts. With publication in the Royal Gazette on 24 August, the upgrade became official.

Administration
The district is divided into six sub-districts (tambons), which are further subdivided into 66 villages (mubans). There are no municipal (thesaban) areas; there are six tambon administrative organization (TAO).

References

External links
amphoe.com

Chiang Khwan